Cypsellurinae is a subfamily of flying fishes, one of four in the family Exocoetidae and the only one which is not monogeneric.

Genera
The following four genera make of the subfamily:

 Cheilopogon Lowe, 1841
 Cypselurus Swainson, 1838
 Hirundichthys Breder, 1928
 Prognichthys Breder, 1928

References

 
Exocoetidae